Seyed Abdol Javad Alamolhoda (: 1930 – 20 August 2020) was an Iranian Ayatollah. He is the older brother of Ahmad Alamolhoda, the Friday prayer leader in Mashhad. He was also the founder of Al-Qaim Seminary in Tehran.

Biography 
Alamolhoda was born into a religious family in Mashhad, son of Seyed Ali Alamolhoda. While attending school he learnt the Quran along with his other studies. At the age of 14, in 1944, he went to Qom to attend the Qom Seminary to begin his Islamic studies. While in Qom he was taught by Ruhollah Khomeini, Hossein Borujerdi, Mohammad Hadi al-Milani, Shahab ud-Din Mar'ashi Najafi, and Morteza Haeri Yazdi After spending many years in Qom, he left to Tehran where he established the Al-Qaim Seminary in 1969. During the events leading to the 1979 Iranian revolution, he was in contact with Khomeini, as he wrote 10 letters to him. In the 70's, he went to France to visit Khomeini, where he delivered secret messages regarding people revolting against the Shah. He was also interrogated by SAVAK, and was banned from giving Khutbahs (lectures) on the Minbar (pulpit).

Works 

 International Zionism
 Hajj
 Scientific Knowledge of the Quran
 A Treatise on Islamic Beliefs in the Shiite Religion
 The Effectiveness of Asking for Forgiveness
 Lectures of Ayatollah Borujerdi
 Lectures on Jurisprudence of Ayatollah Khomeini
 The Fish of this World
 al-Jabr al-Ikhtiyar

Death 
Abdol Javad passed away on Thursday morning 20 August 2020 in Tehran. His funeral prayers took place in the Shahid Motahhari High School, the prayers were led by Mohammed Emami-Kashani. His body was then transferred to Mashhad, where he would be buried next to Imam Reza Shrine. Notable Iranian figures were present, including President Ebrahim Raisi. Ali Khamenei also sent a message of condolences.

See also 

 List of Ayatollahs
 Ahmad Alamolhoda
 Ruhollah Khomeini
 Ruhollah Khomeini's life in exile
 Iranian Revolution

References 

1930 births
2020 deaths
People from Mashhad
Iranian ayatollahs